Punk Drunk & Trembling is the fifth EP by British indie rock band Wild Beasts. It was released on 20 October 2017 through Domino Recording Company. It is composed of out-takes from the sessions to their last album Boy King.

The release was the bands' final release of new material before they split, with three farewell shows that followed in February 2018.

Track listing

References

2017 EPs
Wild Beasts albums
Domino Recording Company EPs